Anuranjan Jha is an Indian journalist and author. He is a well-known persona in Indian media. For the past 25 years, while Mr Jha was praised for his frank, unbiased opinions and constructive experimentation in journalism, he was also instrumental in exposing social corruption at various levels. Some of his stings and investigative stories are rare examples in Media Industry.  He was the founder and CEO of "Media Sarkar", an online current affairs website that conducted controversial sting operation on Aam Aadmi Party in 2013. Prior to that, Jha had launched India's first matrimonial television channel, Shagun TV. His career in journalism spans 25 years. Before launching Shagun TV, Jha has worked with India TV, Cobrapost, Zee News, Aaj Tak, BAG Films, India News and Jansatta, and was chief operating officer (COO) of CNEB, a news channel. He has published three books as an author- Ramlila Maidan, Gandhi Maidan and Jhoom.

Currently living in Shrewsbury, England and contributing as columnist in various national and international media houses including Outlook (Indian magazine)

Early life and education
Jha hails from a small village called Phulwaria in East Champaran district of Bihar. His grandfather's elder brother Ramesh Chandra Jha was a freedom fighter and noted author. Jha graduated in history from University of Delhi and received a post-graduate diploma in Journalism from the Indian Institute of Mass Communication. Later, he also took a post-graduate degree in History from Sabarmati University and Masters in Journalism from GJU.

Career
Jha started his Journalism career with Print Media and worked with Indian Express and Jansatta as a correspondent. At the age of 30, Anuranjan Jha became an Editor and News Director of the Hindi news channel India News. He thereafter worked with companies like Zee news, Aaj Tak, BAG Films, India TV, India News, Cobrapost, Jansatta. He subsequently became managing director of Vertent Media Soft Pvt. Ltd., a media company, where he helped launch a full-fledged 24-hour lifestyle/entertainment TV channel called Shagun TV, India's first matrimonial channel.

Anuranjan Jha founded Park Media Pvt Ltd. in 2009 and started a News and Investigative Web Portal mediasarkar.com in 2010. He is currently founder and CEO of Media Sarkar. He has been writing features, articles, columns on different social and political issues in many national newspapers, magazines and journals. In May 2013 International Magazine Arcade published him on the cover page.

Currently, Jha is writing for Outlook (Indian magazine) on International relations and politics from Shrewsbury, England.

Controversy
Jha came into prominence when Media Sarkar, of which he was the founder and CEO, came out with video tapes to suggest that Aam Aadmi Party(AAP) party members are corrupt. On 21 November 2013, Jha revealed a footage from a sting operation in which he claimed that several AAP leaders were caught accepting money from individuals illegally.

The AAP demanded the raw footage, which Jha refused to provide and invited several agencies and election commission of India to investigate the sting. Later it was realized that the footage published by him to defame AAP was edited because of ill intentions.

Literary Works
Anuranjan Jha's first book "Ramleela-Maidan" was published by Antika Prakashan in 2017. "Ramleela-Maidan" is about Anna movement and the rise and fall of Aam Aadmi Party and Arvind Kejriwal. His Second book "Gandhi-Maidan" unfolds the bluff of social justice in Bihar's politics for the race to power. And recently, he penned "Jhoom", in which he accounted harsh reality of liquor prohibition in Bihar. In 2022, the English edition of his first book, "Ramleela-Maidan" got published.

Undercover Investigative Journalism
Anuranjan Jha is also known for conducting and executing many thrilling, shocking and secret Sting operations in India that have been carried out by different agencies, media houses and organisations over the years that created sensation in the nation and put his life in dangerous situations many times. Jha has allegedly exposed many faces, right from cricketers to politicians and even the Aam Aadmi Party and their politicians and rocked the entire country with the help of a few trusty colleagues and a couple of spy cams.

Bhor Trust
In 2016, Jha established a charitable trust called Bhor trust, to carry out work in the fields of Health and Education in rural Bihar. The trust also gives achiever awards and conducts literary festivals.

Achievements
मेरी दिल्ली अवार्ड (Meri Dilli Award) 2011

References

External links
 Media Sarkar Official Website
 BBC News, Delhi : Story : 31 Oct 2013
 India Today, Delhi : Story : 18 April 2013
 Firstpost : Story Features : 16 Apr 2014
 International Business Times, India Edition : Video Interview : 22 Nov 2013
Work is more important then organisation : Anuranjan Jha.  INTERVIEW, 14 Aug 2009
 Anuranjan Jha on Times Now, The Newshour Debate
 Anuranjan Jha on ABP News
 Anuranjan Jha from Newsroom on CNEB
 Young Talk, CNEB
 Anuranjan Jha talks with Manoj Tiwari

Delhi University alumni
Indian columnists
Indian political journalists
Indian male television journalists
1977 births
Living people
Indian male journalists
Indian investigative journalists
Indian bloggers
Journalists from Bihar
20th-century Indian journalists
21st-century Indian journalists
People from Motihari
Male bloggers